The 1945 Denver Pioneers football team was an American football team that represented the University of Denver as member of the Mountain States Conference (MSC) during the 1945 college football season. In its fifth season under head coach Cac Hubbard, the team compiled a 4–5–1 record (4–1 against MSC opponents), won the MSC championship, lost to New Mexico in the Sun Bowl, and outscored all opponents by a total of 201 to 182.

Three Denver players were selected as first-team players on the All-Rocky Mountain football teams selected by the Associated Press (AP) or International News Service (INS): halfback Johnny Karamigios (AP-1; INS-1); guard Chet Latcham (AP-1; INS-1); and fullback John Adams (AP-1; INS-1). Other Denver player receiving mention included quarterback Bob Hazelhurst, end Wayne Flanigan, tackle George Miller, guard Leo Ford, and center Wes Webber.

Schedule

References

Denver
Denver Pioneers football seasons
Mountain States Conference football champion seasons
Denver Pioneers football